The 2001 UCI Track Cycling World Championships were the World Championship for track cycling. They took place in Antwerp, Belgium from September 26 to September 30, 2001.

Medal table

Medal summary

External links
 World Track Championships – CM Antwerpen, Belgium, September 26-30, 2001 Cycling News

 
Uci Track Cycling World Championships, 2001
Track cycling
UCI Track Cycling World Championships by year
International cycle races hosted by Belgium
UCI Track Cycling World Championships